The 2016 FIBA Europe Cup Final Four was the inaugural Final Four tournament in FIBA Europe Cup history, and was the concluding stage of the 2015–16 FIBA Europe Cup season. The Final Four was held from 29 April until 1 May 2016.

On 6 April 2016, FIBA announced that the tournament was to be held at Le Colisée in Chalon-sur-Saône, France. German side Fraport Skyliners won the tournament.

Venue

Teams

Road to the Final Four

Bracket

Semi-finals

Openjobmetis Varese vs Élan Chalon

Fraport Skyliners vs Enisey

Third place game

Final 

This was Skyliners Frankfurt's first chance to win a European title ever in its club history. For Varese, this was already the 13th appearance in the Final of a European club competition; the Italians won the FIBA European Champions Cup (5 times) and FIBA Saporta Cup (2 times) before. However, Varese's last European victory was back in 1980.

Fraport Skyliners clawed their way back from a 12-point third-quarter deficit to edge out OpenjobMetis Varese 66–62 in a gripping FIBA Europe Cup final and lift the first European trophy in club history. Quantez Robertson of Fraport, who scored 15 points in the Final, was named Final Four MVP.

Final Four MVP

References

See also
2016 Euroleague Final Four
2016 Eurocup Finals

Final
2016
2015–16 in French basketball
2015–16 in German basketball
2015–16 in Russian basketball
2015–16 in Italian basketball
Chalon-sur-Saône
International basketball competitions hosted by France
April 2016 sports events in Europe
May 2016 sports events in Europe